Plater coat of arms is a Polish coat of arms. It was used by several szlachta families in the times of the Kingdom of Poland and the Polish–Lithuanian Commonwealth.

Its most famous bearer was Emilia Plater, a Polish-Lithuanian heroine of the November uprising.

External links 
  Coat of Arms Plater (altered) 

Polish coats of arms